is a railway station operated by JR Kyushu in Tosu, Saga Prefecture, Japan.

Lines

Layout
The station consists of two island platforms serving four tracks.

Adjacent stations

History
The station was opened by JR Kyushu on 3 March 2001 as an added station on the existing Kagoshima Main Line track.

Surrounding area
Tosu Junction (Kyūshū Expressway, Nagasaki Expressway and Ōita Expressway)
National Route 3
National Route 34
Tosu Premium Outlets

See also
List of railway stations in Japan

References

External links
Yayoigaoka (JR Kyushu)

Railway stations in Saga Prefecture
Railway stations in Japan opened in 2001